"Love Is Forever" is Tomoko Kawase's fifth single released as Tommy February6, and the second single for her second studio album, "Tommy Airline". The single was released July 16, 2003, and peaked at number six in Japan and stayed on the charts for seven weeks. The single was released the same day as Tommy heavenly6's debut single "Wait till I Can Dream". It was also used as an insert song in episode 5 of the anime Paradise Kiss.

Track listing

References

External links 
 Tommy february6 Official Site Warner Music Japan (Current Official Site)
 Tommy february6 Official Site Sony Music Japan (Previous Official Site)
 Tommy february6 - Love is forever on YouTube, published by zaibax february6

2003 singles
2003 songs
Tomoko Kawase songs
Defstar Records singles
Songs written by Tomoko Kawase
Songs written by Shunsaku Okuda